Sacada discinota is a species of moth of the family Pyralidae described by Frederic Moore in 1866. It is found in India and Taiwan.

References

Moths described in 1866
Pyralinae